is a Japanese actor. He is probably best known for playing Yoshio Akamatsu in Battle Royale.

Filmography
Battle Royale, 2000
Tomie: Re-birth, 2001

External links
 

Japanese male actors
Living people
1979 births
Place of birth missing (living people)
21st-century Japanese actors